The Road and the Radio is the tenth studio album by American country music artist Kenny Chesney. It was released on November 8, 2005 via BNA Records. The album debuted at number one on the US Top Country Albums and US Billboard 200 charts.

Content
The album produced five singles between 2005 and 2007 with the songs "Who You'd Be Today", "Living in Fast Forward", "Summertime", "You Save Me", and "Beer in Mexico".  All singles made it to the Top 10 on the U.S. Billboard Hot Country Songs chart. "Living in Fast Forward", "Summertime", and "Beer in Mexico" all reached number one. "Who You'd Be Today" peaked at number 2, and "You Save Me" went to number 3.

Track listing

Personnel

Compiled in liner notes
Jeff Bailey - trumpet
Wyatt Beard - piano, background vocals
Pat Buchanan - electric guitar
Buddy Cannon - background vocals
Melonie Cannon - background vocals
Kenny Chesney - lead vocals
J. T. Corenflos - electric guitar
Chad Cromwell - drums
Dan Dugmore - steel guitar
Chris Dunn - trombone
Kenny Greenberg - acoustic guitar, electric guitar
Rob Hajacos - fiddle
Tim Hensley - banjo, ukulele, background vocals
Steve Hinson - steel guitar
John Hobbs - piano, keyboards, B3 organ, synthesizer
Jim Horn - baritone saxophone
Mike Johnson - steel guitar
John Jorgenson - acoustic guitar, electric guitar, baritone guitar
Paul Leim - drums, percussion
Samuel B. Levine - tenor saxophone
B. James Lowry - acoustic guitar, electric guitar, nylon string guitar
Randy McCormick - piano, keyboards, B3 organ, Wurlitzer electric piano
Steve Nathan - synthesizer
Steve Patrick - trumpet
Larry Paxton - bass guitar
Michael Rhodes - bass guitar
John Willis - acoustic guitar, nylon string guitar, banjo

Charts

Weekly charts

Year-end charts

Singles

Certifications

References

External links
 

2005 albums
Kenny Chesney albums
BNA Records albums
Albums produced by Buddy Cannon
Albums produced by Norro Wilson